Kőszárhegy is a village in Fejér county, Hungary.

External links 
 Street map 

Populated places in Fejér County